Robert William Wood (March 4, 1889 – March 14, 1979) was an American landscape painter. He was born in England, emigrated to the United States and rose to prominence in the 1950s with the sales of millions of his color reproductions. He was active in the art colonies of San Antonio, Texas in the 1930s, Monterey, California in the 1940s and Laguna Beach in the 1950s.

Biography

Life and work
Robert William Wood was born in Sandgate, Kent, England, near the White Cliffs of Dover. His father, W. L. Wood, was a renowned home and church painter who recognized and supported his son's talent. He forced his son to paint by keeping him inside rather than letting him play with his friends. At age 12, Wood entered the South Kensington School of Art in nearby Folkestone. While in school, Wood won four first awards and three second awards for his paintings. After emigrating from England in 1910, he roamed the United States from Maine to California in search of landscape subjects. He eventually settled in Laguna Beach, California in 1940.

Robert Wood reproductions
Wood's work was widely published by a number of publishers, the most prolific being Donald Bonnist's Donald Art Company, which distributed more than one million copies of October Morn, Wood's most popular print, in less than two years. Wood was at the peak of his fame in the 1950s through 1970s when his scenes of the Catskill Mountains in New York, the California coast, the Grand Tetons, the Rocky Mountains, the Texas Hill Country and the Cascades were most popular. His popularity made him a household name in America.  Millions of his reproductions were printed in large editions by a number of publishers. Titles like Autumn Bronze, Early Spring, Pine & Birch, Texas Spring, and The Old Mill are found in homes across North America.

Studio locations
He lived in rural Ohio; Seattle, Washington; Portland, Oregon; San Antonio, Texas; Monterey, California; Laguna Beach, California; Woodstock, New York; San Diego, California; and Bishop, California. He was a popular exhibitor at the Laguna Art Festival and a Life Member of the Laguna Art Association.  He was represented by galleries in Laguna Beach, Los Angeles, San Antonio, Dallas, Austin,  Pittsburgh, Philadelphia, Atlanta, and Cleveland.

Later life
Wood moved to the Owens Valley in Bishop, California in the early 1960s with his wife, the artist Caryl Wood. On a large parcel of land with its own trout pond, they built studios for each of them.  While in Bishop, the Woods became friends with landscape painters Robert Clunie and Richard Coons. The Woods sold the property to move to San Diego, where they restored a Victorian home.  After a few years in San Diego, they returned to Bishop, where they purchased a smaller property.

Wood died in Bishop at the age of ninety, just a month before a large retrospective exhibition was mounted at the Morseburg Galleries in Los Angeles, by Howard Morseburg and the Newport Beach gallery owner Raymond Hagen.

Productivity
Wood was an extremely facile painter and his artistic production was substantial, in excess of 5,000 completed works. His work is sold at galleries specializing in historic American art and is sold frequently at auction, with his auction record in excess of $40,000.

See also

 California Plein-Air Painting
 American Impressionism
 Robert Clunie, a California plein-air artist and Bishop friend
 Carl Hoppe, a South Texas artist who worked with Wood

Notes

Sources
 Kronquist, Lawrence, Robert Wood, gallery brochure, Laguna Beach, California, 1973
 Gaston, Godfrey, Robert Wood Retrospective, Exhibition Catalog, Morseburg Galleries, Los Angeles, California, 1979
 Morseburg, Jeffrey, Robert Wood Centennial, Exhibition Catalog, Morseburg Galleries, Los Angeles, California, 1989
 Morseburg, Jeffrey, Robert W. Wood (1889–1979), unpublished essay, West Hollywood, California, 2007
 Interview with Howard E. Morseburg (b. 1924), Wood's Los Angeles dealer, Santa Ynez, California, 2010

Further reading
 Fillmore, Gary, Canyon Magic: Landmark Art from the Picerne Collection, 2010
 Dunbier, Lonnie Pierson (Editor), The Artists Bluebook: 34,000 North American Artists, 2005
 Davenport, Ray	Davenport's Art Reference: The Gold Edition, 2005
 Vose, Marcia Latimore (editor), Vose Art Notes: A Guide for Collectors, Winter 2003, Volume XI
 Hughes, Edan Milton, Artists in California: 1786-1940 (two volumes), 2002
 Grauer, Michael R and E. Harvey, The Eyes of Texas: The Bill and Mary Cheek Collection, 2001
 Powers, John & Deborah, Texas Painters, Sculptors & Graphic Artists: A Biographical Dictionary of Artists in Texas Before 1942, 2000
 Falk, Peter Hastings (editor), Who Was Who in American Art, 1564-1975, 3 volumes, 1999
 Grauer, Paula and Michael R., Dictionary of Texas Artists, 1800–1945, 1999
 McCann, Chris, Master Pieces: The Art History of Jigsaw Puzzles, 1998
 Southwest Art, Red Book Price Guide to Western American Art, 1997
 Jones Gallery, New Beginnings: A Group Exhibition, 1993
 Southwest Art Magazine, The Red Book: Western American Price Index, 1993
 Steinfeld, Cecilia; William H. Goetzmann (Intro), Art for History's Sake The Texas Collection of the Witte Museum 1993
 Falk, Peter Hastings, Dictionary of Signatures & Monograms, 1988
 Zellman, Michael David, 300 Years of American Art, (two volumes), 1986
 Dawdy, Doris, Artists of the American West:A Biographical Dictionary (3 volumes), 1985
 Falk, Peter Hastings (editor), Who Was Who in American Art: Artists Active Between 1898-1947
 Flume, Violet, The Last Mountain: The Life of Robert Wood, 1983
 Schimmel, Julie; Gilbert Tapley, Vincent Stark Museum of Art: The Western Collection, 1978
 Samuels, Peggy and Harold, The Illustrated Biographical Encyclopedia of Artists of the American West, 1976
 Museum of Texas Tech University, Selections from the Collection of Mr. & Mrs. Fred T. Hogan, 1974
 Hagen, Raymond, Robert Wood Exhibition, 1970

External links
 Website devoted to Robert W. Wood
 Mount Shasta as a visual resource
 Texasbluebonnetpainters website

American landscape painters
English landscape painters
1889 births
1979 deaths
People from Sandgate, Kent
20th-century American painters
20th-century American male artists
American male painters
British emigrants to the United States